"If the Cap Fits..." is the sixth episode of the fifth series of the British television sitcom Dad's Army. It was originally transmitted on 10 November 1972.

Synopsis
Mainwairing is giving a slide show, but Frazer comments he is wasting everyone's time on a fine summer evening with another irrelevant lecture. Mainwairing decides to let Frazer take over for a few days to assuage his grumbling.

Plot
The episode opens with the Walmington-on-Sea Home Guard unit in the church hall, waiting for Mainwaring to give a presentation. The platoon is disgruntled at being shut in on a fine summer evening and, led by Frazer, they begin a chorus of "Why are we waiting", which sounds like O Come All Ye Faithful. Mainwaring enters and tells them to be quiet. He begins to give them a farcical slideshow entitled "Know your enemy", which contains exaggerated drawings of German infantrymen, panzer crew and parachutists. The show is narrated languidly by Wilson, who insists on wearing a monocle. Mainwaring interjects with stereotypical comments such as:
 "Note the eyes – close together, mean, shifty – that's typically Nazi"
 "Look at the thick red bull neck, watch out for that"
 "He has no lobes on his ears, a well known criminal trait"

Jones is attempting to operate the projector, much hampered by the Verger, who is there to prevent any "damage to the Vicar's apparatus". Godfrey is asleep, whilst Walker and Pike interject with silly questions. Hodges arrives, and accuses them of looking at dirty pictures, and Jones finally messes up, showing a picture of a topless Zulu woman from the Vicar's slide collection, "Light into Darkest Africa", much to Hodges' delight and Mainwaring's discomfort.

Afterwards in the office, Mainwaring threatens to stop Wilson wearing the monocle, but Wilson responds by threatening to tell everyone that Mainwaring wears arch supports for his feet. Frazer enters, and not only tells Mainwaring the lecture is a waste of time, but consults notes he has made and reminds Mainwaring of other similar irrelevant lectures, such as "Why the Germans don't play cricket" and "How to send Hitler a poisoned carpet" (because he chews the rug when angry), and observes that Mainwaring has wasted 438 hours on "useless blather". Naturally, Mainwaring is furious at Frazer's insubordinate behaviour. He consults the Home Guard manual and discovers a potential solution to the problem. Back on parade, he challenges Frazer to take command of the platoon for a week. To Mainwaring's surprise, Frazer agrees.

Once Frazer is in charge, he swiftly sacks Sergeant Wilson for discrepancies in the platoon stores, and is so rude to Jones (calling him a "wooly-minded old ditherer") that he resigns. Mainwaring has been banished to the broom cupboard, where he is soon joined by a furious Wilson and a distraught Jones. Mainwaring observes that Frazer is playing into their hands by "antagonizing" the rest of the platoon, reasoning that if nobody will serve under Frazer, "he's done for". They are interrupted by Pike, who reveals that he is the platoon's new lance corporal, having been promoted by Frazer, due to Pike's "hidden qualities" of "drive, tenacity, and leadership". Just as the other three men are recovering from the shock, they are interrupted by Wilson's replacement, the newly-promoted Sergeant Walker, who assumes the demeanour of a hard-nosed NCO, complete with swagger stick, and proceeds to tell the now-Privates Wilson and Jones that they can go home (to "recuperate"). He also passes on a request from Frazer: that Mainwaring should turn over his own swagger stick and leather gloves which infuriates Mainwaring due to him angrily asking "How dare he?"

Back in Mainwaring's office, Frazer is having a chat with Godfrey. Initially, Frazer appears sympathetic to Godfrey's age and health-related problems, telling him that if he ever feels unwell, he will be excused without any trouble. After a grateful Godfrey thanks him, Frazer changes his manner, sternly telling Godfrey that if he does decide to come on parade, he will receive no special treatment, and will have to do what the other members of the platoon do "or take the consequences". Just then, a Scottish officer, Major-General Menzies, arrives. A puzzled Godfrey departs, and Frazer and Menzies discuss the state of the platoon as it currently stands. Pleased at finding a fellow Scot in command, Menzies invites Frazer to play the bagpipes to pipe in the haggis at a forthcoming regimental dinner. Frazer agrees, though, as Menzies departs, he calls Frazer "Mainwaring", revealing that he is unaware that Frazer has temporarily replaced Mainwaring as commander of the platoon.

Discussing his arrangement with the Colonel in the mess, Menzies tells the Colonel to organise the dinner, and the Colonel (who, unlike Menzies, knows Mainwaring) expresses his surprise that Mainwaring is Scottish and can play the pipes.

Back in the church hall, Frazer's tenure has ended. Mainwaring is quick to re-establish control and forget about the whole incident, although both Walker and Pike speak up in favour of Frazer, while Jones remains loyal to Mainwaring. Frazer attempts to tell Mainwaring about the commitment to pipe the haggis at the dinner, but Mainwaring does not give him a chance.

Later, Mainwaring and the platoon arrive at the regimental dinner. A sergeant appears and takes Mainwaring through the procedure. Finally, to Mainwaring's surprise, the sergeant presents him with some bagpipes. Expecting Mainwaring to be nonplussed, Frazer issues an ultimatum: "It was me he asked to play the pipes because he was impressed with my handling of the platoon. I'll play the pipes for you if you let me go into the dinner at the head of MY platoon". Mainwaring refuses, provoking Wilson to ask: "Are you absolutely sure you're doing the right thing?". Mainwaring eventually shoulders the pipes, and the platoon forms up, ready to lead the haggis in. Frazer predicts doom, but Mainwaring turns to Wilson and says,

"I spent my honeymoon in a remote village in Scotland called InverGeechie [sic]. It was a wild and lonely place. The nights were long ... and there was nothing else to do."

To everyone's amazement, Mainwaring starts the pipes and, playing magnificently, leads the haggis party into the mess. Frazer is left outside, dumbfounded. He finally shouts: "I never doubted you for a moment, sir, never for a single moment! God forgive me!" and rushes in after the rest.

Cast

Arthur Lowe as Captain Mainwaring
John Le Mesurier as Sergeant Wilson
Clive Dunn as Lance Corporal Jones
John Laurie as Private Frazer
James Beck as Private Walker
Arnold Ridley as Private Godfrey
Ian Lavender as Private Pike
Bill Pertwee as ARP Warden Hodges
Robert Raglan as Colonel Pritchard
Campbell Singer as Major-General Menzies
Alex McAvoy as The Sergeant

Further reading

External links

   

Dad's Army (series 5) episodes
1972 British television episodes